Exocyst complex component 6B is a protein that in humans is encoded by the EXOC6B gene.

Function 

In yeast and rat, Sec15 is part of a multiprotein complex that is required for targeted exocytosis.

References

Further reading